Ousby is a village and civil parish in Eden district, in the English county of Cumbria. It is a Thankful Village, one of 52 parishes in England and Wales that suffered no casualties during World War I. The parish had a population of 362 in 2001, which had increased to 447 at the 2011 Census, and includes the hamlets of Crewgarth, Row, Shire and Townhead. Melmerby parish was absorbed on 1 April 1934, on 1 April 2019 Melmerby became a separate parish again.

Amenities 
Ousby has a pub called the Fox Inn, a camp site and one place of worship, in Townhead, which is called St Luke's Church. A former chapel at Row has now been converted to a holiday home.

Location 

There is a fell in the Pennines named Ousby Fell.

See also

Listed buildings in Ousby

References

External links
 Cumbria County History Trust: Ousby (nb: provisional research only – see Talk page)
 Visit Cumbria

Villages in Cumbria
Civil parishes in Cumbria
Eden District